Plum Creek is a census-designated place in Montgomery County, Virginia, United States, just east of Radford. The population as of the 2010 Census was 1,524.

References

Census-designated places in Montgomery County, Virginia
Census-designated places in Virginia